Georgios Athanasiadis (born 5 June 1962) is a Greek wrestler. He competed at the 1984 Summer Olympics, the 1988 Summer Olympics and the 1992 Summer Olympics.

References

External links
 

1962 births
Living people
Greek male sport wrestlers
Olympic wrestlers of Greece
Wrestlers at the 1984 Summer Olympics
Wrestlers at the 1988 Summer Olympics
Wrestlers at the 1992 Summer Olympics
Sportspeople from Tashkent
20th-century Greek people